Mukarrib  (Old South Arabian: ,) is a title variously defined as "priest-kings" or "federators"; the mukarribs may have been the first rulers of the early South Arabian states. Sometime in the fourth century BCE, the title was replaced by Malik, typically translated as "king".

Scholarly interpretations
Stuart Munro-Hay writes that the title of mukarrib "indicates something like 'federator', and in southern Arabia was assumed by the ruler who currently held the primacy over a group of tribes linked by a covenant." Thus, mukarrib can be regarded as a South Arabian hegemon, the head of confederation of South Arabian sha`bs headed by "kings" ('mlk). In the 1st millennium BCE there was usually one mukarrib in South Arabia, but many "kings".

Joy McCorriston took a slightly different viewpoint:

See also
 List of rulers of Saba and Himyar

References

Bibliography 
Andrey Korotayev. Ancient Yemen. Oxford: Oxford University Press, 1995. .
Ancient history of Yemen
South Arabia
Titles in Middle East
Royal titles